Profile of a Serial Killer is a 1998 Australian crime television film directed by Steve Jodrell and starring Rebecca Gibney, Shane Feeney-Connor and Hugh Jackman. The film was released on DVD on 19 October 2004.

Premise
When a shocking massacre in a small-town diner leaves no clues, Forensic Psychologist Dr. Jane Halifax (Gibney) teams up with Senior Detective Eric Ringer (Jackman) for one of the toughest cases of their careers.

References

External links
 
 

1998 films
Australian television films
1990s English-language films